Hethe is a surname. Notable people with the surname include:

Thomas Hethe, MP for Suffolk (UK Parliament constituency)
Robert Hethe (died 1396), English politician
Hamo Hethe